Pappinivattom  is a village in Thrissur district in the state of Kerala, India.

Demographics
 India census, Pappinivattom had a population of 14611 with 6780 males and 7831 females.

References

Villages in Thrissur district